The Capital City Go-Go are an American professional basketball team in the NBA G League based in Washington, D.C., and are affiliated with the Washington Wizards. The Go-Go play their home games at the St. Elizabeths East Entertainment and Sports Arena. The team became the twenty-third G League team to be owned by an NBA team.

History
In December 2017, the Washington Wizards unveiled the Capital City Go-Go's name and released their logo. The team's name alludes to the go-go music genre that emerged in Washington, D.C. in the mid-1960s to late 1970s. On August 7, 2018, the Washington Wizards named Pops Mensah-Bonsu as general manager and Jarell Christian as head coach. After one season, Christian joined the Wizards as an assistant coach and was replaced by Ryan Richman. Following the pandemic-curtailed 2019–20 season, Pops Mensah-Bonsu left the team. The Go-Go were one of several teams to opt out of the abbreviated 2020–21 bubble season in Orlando, and the Wizards came to an agreement to loan players to the Erie BayHawks. The Wizards then assigned Amber Nichols as Capital City's general manager and to work alongside their players with the BayHawks, becoming the second woman to hold that position in the G League after the College Park Skyhawks' Tori Miller.

Season by season

Current roster

Head coaches

NBA affiliates
 Washington Wizards (2018–present)

References

External links

 

 
2017 establishments in Washington, D.C.
Basketball teams established in 2017
Basketball teams in Washington, D.C.
Washington Wizards